Ivan Lendl was the defending champion (the previous year was an exhibition), but chose not to participate that year.

Stefan Edberg won in the final 7–6(7–3), 6–3, against Goran Ivanišević.

Seeds
The top four seeds receive a bye into the second round. 

  Stefan Edberg (champion)
  Andrés Gómez (quarterfinals)
  Brad Gilbert (quarterfinals)
  Pete Sampras (quarterfinals)
  Goran Ivanišević (final)
  John McEnroe (semifinals)
  Jonas Svensson (quarterfinals)
  Guy Forget (semifinals)

Draw

Finals

Top half

Bottom half

External links
Draw

Singles